The Lago di Santa Croce is a semi-natural lake in the  province of Belluno, Veneto, northern Italy. It is part of the communes of Alpago and Ponte nelle Alpi.

It was originally naturally a smaller lake, but was expanded with a dam during the 1930s.

Outlets of the lake include the Piave.

The area is quite a windy location and as such is a popular sailing, watersports and kitesurfing location.

Lakes of Veneto